All That We Needed is the third studio album by American rock band Plain White T's, released on January 25, 2005. This is Plain White T's second album with Fearless Records. In July 2007, after the release of Every Second Counts (2006), the song "Hey There Delilah" was re-issued as a single and sold unexpectedly well, reaching number one on the US Billboard Hot 100. The album was certified gold by the Recording Industry Association of America (RIAA).

Commercial performance
All That We Needed missed the Billboard 200 chart, but still managed to appear on the US Heatseekers Albums chart.
The album peaked at number 26 on the chart. On July 31, 2017, the album was certified gold by the Recording Industry Association of America (RIAA) for combined sales and album-equivalent units of over 500,000 units in the United States.

Track listing

Personnel
 Tom Higgenson – lead vocals, acoustic guitar
 Tim G. Lopez – lead guitar, backing vocals
 Dave Tirio – rhythm guitar
 Mike Retondo – bass guitar, backing vocals
 De'Mar Hamilton – drums, percussion

Charts

Certifications

References

External links 
 Euphonia Online interview about the album

2005 albums
Plain White T's albums
Fearless Records albums